Saulkrasti Jazz Festival is a jazz festival in Latvia. It is held annually in July in Saulkrasti. The weeklong festival consists of concerts and educational camps for young musicians.

Competitions 
Baltic Drummers' League is an international competition for young drummers at the Saulkrasti Jazz Festival. It is organized with Riga Dome Choir School and Paiste. Competitors are divided in two groups: Juniors of 14- to 17-year-olds and the Seniors of 18- to 25-year-olds. Finals are judged by an international panel of judges. The program may not exceed 15 minutes. International panel of judges: Eric Moore (US), Aleksandr Murenko (Ukraine), Venko Poromanski (Bulgaria), Zaza Tsertsvadze (Georgia). Program:
 Solo small drums (up to 3 minutes)
 Solo percussion set (up to 4 minutes)
 Playing on a phonogram or with an ensemble (up to 5 minutes)
 Seniors only: Open solo (up to 3 minutes)

Performers 

 3Stick – 2011
 A-Band – 2011
 Apple Tea – 2011
 Ari-Pekka Antilla – 1998
 Arvidas Jofe – 1997
 Audrey Motaung – 1999
 Billy Cobham & Culture Mix – 2000
 City Jazz Band – 2008
 City Jazz Youth Band – 2011
 Christoph Titz Band – 2007
 Dainius Pulauskas – 1997
 Dave Weckl – 2005
 David Becker – 2011
 Djabe feat. Steve Hackett – 2008
 Dom Famularo – 2012
 Evergreen – 2011
 Gin Gas – 2011
 Gunārs Rozenbergs – 2011
 Harri Ihanus Quartet – 2007
 Hedvig Hanson – 1997
 James Taylor Quartet – 2011
 Johnny "Manhattan" Taylor – 1999
 JMRMV – 2011
 Kalniņš, Pabērzs, Grunte, Orubs – 2011
 Karlheinz Miklin, Heiri Kaenzig & Billy Hart Trio – 2008
 Kestutis Vaiginis Quartet – 2010
 Latvijas Radio Big Bands – 1997
 Laura Polence Project – 2011
 Marija Naumova – 1998
 Matīss Čudars Quartet – 2011
 Mel Gaynor – 1999
 Mezzoforte – 2007
 Michael Kuttner & Coyote Trio – 1997, 1998
 Mirage Jazz Orchestra – 2011
 Mirage Octet & Assembly Singers – 2010
 Mo' Blow – 2012
 Ola Onabule – 2012
 Olga Pīrāgs – 1997
 Patina – 2010
 Raimonds Pauls – 1997, 1998
 Raimonds Raubiško – 1997
 Raita Ašmaņa Jelgavas Big Band – 2010, 2011
 Raul Sööt – 1997
 RDKS Combo – 2011
 Retro Music Quartet – 2011
 Riga Libre – 2011
 Riga Retro – 2011
 Siguldas diksilends – 2011
 Simone Moreno & Os Lourinhos – 2011
 Sinkope – 2011
 Sophie Bernado & Sir Chac Bulay – 2011
 Steinar Aadnekvam Quartet – 2011
 Steve Smith & Vital Information – 2008, 2012
 Teppo Makinene – 1998
 The Briefing – 2010
 Tiago Loei & Friends – 2011
 Toomas Rull – 1997
 Twin Town – 2010
 Vein – 2011
 Ventspils Big Band – 2010, 2011
 Victor Bailey Group feat. Lenny White – 2007
 Victor Solomin Band – 2007
 Wolfgang Haffner – 2003
 Wolfgang Haffner's Zooming Band – 2005
 Wolfgang Haffner Shapes – 2007
 Xylem Trio – 2010, 2011
 Yuval Ron and Residents of the Future – 2008

External links 
 Official website

Saulkrasti
Music festivals in Latvia
Music festivals established in 1997
Jazz festivals in Latvia
1997 establishments in Latvia
Summer events in Latvia